The GlaxoSmithKline Prize and Lecture is awarded by the Royal Society of London "for original contributions to medical and veterinary sciences published within ten years from the date of the award". Sponsored by GlaxoSmithKline, the medal is awarded with a gift of £2500. The medal was first awarded in 1980 to César Milstein "in recognition of his pioneering the production of monoclonal antibodies from hybrid cell lines and initiating their application worldwide in many fields of biology and medicine", and has since been awarded 13 times.

List of recipients 
Source: Royal Society

See also

 List of medicine awards

References 

Awards of the Royal Society
GSK plc
Medicine awards
Veterinary medicine in the United Kingdom